Teenage Mutant Ninja Turtles is an American computer animated series based on the eponymous characters. It aired on Nickelodeon in the United States from September 28, 2012, to November 12, 2017.

Series overview

{| class="wikitable" style="text-align: center"
|-
! colspan="2" rowspan="2" | Season
! rowspan="2" rowspan="2" | Episodes
! colspan="2" | Originally aired
|-
! First aired
! Last aired
|-
! style="background:#00a| || 1
| rowspan=4|26 each
| 
| 
|-
! style="background:#00AE1D| || 2
| 
| 
|-
! style="background:#564CA5| || 3
| 
| 
|-
! style="background:#FFA500| || 4
| 
| 
|-
! style="background:#FF6048| || |5
| 20
| 
| 
|}

Episodes

Season 1 (2012–2013)
The episodes aired with their working titles outside North America.

The turtles get out from the sewers for the first time and meet adventures where they fight their newest enemies: The Kraang and the Foot Clan.

Season 2 (2013–2014)
A conflict rises from the sewers to the outside world when the turtles drop mutagen from a Kraang ship and mutate April's father into a bat. Cause of this conflict April leaves the team    but meets no one else than: Casey Jones.

Season 3 (2014–2015)
In woods four, immature, mutated, ninjitsu-skilled turtles live with their friends: the half-human half-alien mutant: April O'Neil and a hockey player+hero: Casey Jones, cause of the invasion The Kraang did to New York.

Season 4 (2015–2017)
Space is endless but earth has only end-ness, as turtles, April and Casey must find parts of  "Heart of Darkness". The second half of this season includes turtles fight an old enemy who is now a brand new one, Super Shredder!

Season 5: Tales of The Teenage Mutant Ninja Turtles (2017)
This is a big pack of adventures as the turtles get more adventures Than ever!

Half-Shell Heroes: Blast To The Past
 The turtles are trying to catch Bebop, Rocksteady & Tiger Claw, but during the process they end up in prehistoric times!

Shorts

See also
List of Teenage Mutant Ninja Turtles characters

Notes

References

Lists of American children's animated television series episodes
Episodes
Lists of Nickelodeon television series episodes
Teenage Mutant Ninja Turtles, 2012
2012